The Aboriginal Shire of Lockhart River is a local government area in Far North Queensland, Australia.

Geography
It is on the east coast of the Cape York Peninsula and consists of a single locality, Lockhart River (which is shared with the Shire of Cook). It includes a number of islands off the east coast: Chapman Island, Lloyd Island, Rocky Island, Sherrard Island and Sunter Island.

Amenities 
The Lockhart River Shire Council operate the Lockhart River Indigenous Knowledge Centre at Lockhart River.

Mayors 

 2020–present: Wayne William Butcher

References

 
Lockhart River